is a 1955 black-and-white Japanese film directed by Minoru Shibuya.  It was entered into the 1956 Cannes Film Festival.

Cast
 Eiji Okada
 Kazuko Okada
 Osamu Takizawa
 Shinobu Araki
 Akira Ishihama
 Kyōko Kagawa
 Kinzo Shin
 Kōji Mitsui
 Isao Yamagata
 Hitomi Nozoe

References

External links

1955 films
1950s Japanese-language films
Japanese black-and-white films
Films directed by Minoru Shibuya
Shochiku films
Japanese drama films
1955 drama films
1950s Japanese films